Mihály Tóth (born 27 December 1974) is a Hungarian footballer who last plays for Diósgyőri VTK of Hungary. He previously played for MFC Sopron and Fredrikstad F.K. of Norway.

Honours
 Hungarian League Top Scorer:1
2004
 Magyar Kupa:1
2005
 Norwegian Football Cup:1
2006

External links
,  Pictures

1974 births
Living people
Hungarian footballers
Budapest Honvéd FC players
Fehérvár FC players
Ferencvárosi TC footballers
FC Sopron players
Diósgyőri VTK players
FC Metz players
Fredrikstad FK players
Beerschot A.C. players
Hungarian expatriate footballers
Expatriate footballers in Norway
Expatriate footballers in France
Expatriate footballers in Belgium
Expatriate footballers in Greece
Belgian Pro League players
Ligue 1 players
Eliteserien players
Nemzeti Bajnokság I players
Association football forwards
Hungary international footballers
Footballers from Budapest